The 1974–75 Danish 1. division season was the 18th season of ice hockey in Denmark. Ten teams participated in the league, and Gladsaxe SF won the championship. Brøndby was relegated.

First round

Final round
The top six teams qualified for the final round, and Gladsaxe SF finished first.

External links
Season on eliteprospects.com

Danish
1974 in Danish sport
1975 in Danish sport